GZ or gz may refer to:

 .gz, the file extension for gzip files (GNU zip, an open source file compression program)
 GZ, an HCPCS Level II modifier meaning an item or service is expected to be denied as not reasonable or necessary 
 GZ, the "righting moment" or "righting arm" acting to restore a tilting ship to vertical; see metacentric height 
 Galaxy Zoo, a crowdsourced astronomy project
 Gaza Strip (FIPS PUB 10-4 territory code)
 Gestrichener Zellstoffkarton (German; DIN 19303 Code), a grade of paperboard also known as solid bleached board
 Ground Zero, in military parlance
 Guangzhou, capital and largest city of Guangdong Province in southeastern China
 Guizhou, a province of China (Guobiao abbreviation GZ)
 Air Rarotonga (IATA airline designator)
 Metal Gear Solid V: Ground Zeroes, a 2014 video game